Alec Leroy Lucas (born 1 December 1945) is a Welsh former professional footballer who played as a full-back. He made appearances in the English Football League with Wrexham. He also played for Bradley Rangers and Bangor City.

References

1945 births
Living people
English footballers
Association football defenders
Queens Park Rangers F.C. players
Bradley Rangers F.C. players
Wrexham A.F.C. players
Bangor City F.C. players
English Football League players